Minuwangoda Grama Niladhari Division is a Grama Niladhari Division of the Galle Four Gravets Divisional Secretariat of Galle District of Southern Province, Sri Lanka. It has Grama Niladhari Division Code 96H.

Galle Harbour, St. Mary's Cathedral, Galle, Roman Catholic Diocese of Galle, St. Aloysius' College, Galle, Sacred Heart Convent Galle, China Garden and Galle International Stadium are located within, nearby or associated with Minuwangoda.

Minuwangoda is a surrounded by the Cheena Koratuwa, Kaluwella, Kandewatta and Weliwatta Grama Niladhari Divisions.

Demographics

Ethnicity 

The Minuwangoda Grama Niladhari Division has a Sinhalese majority (95.1%). In comparison, the Galle Four Gravets Divisional Secretariat (which contains the Minuwangoda Grama Niladhari Division) has a Sinhalese majority (66.8%) and a significant Moor population (32.1%)

Religion 

The Minuwangoda Grama Niladhari Division has a Buddhist majority (94.1%). In comparison, the Galle Four Gravets Divisional Secretariat (which contains the Minuwangoda Grama Niladhari Division) has a Buddhist majority (65.7%) and a significant Muslim population (32.3%)

Gallery

References 

Grama Niladhari Divisions of Galle Four Gravets Divisional Secretariat